Roland Stephen Taylor (born December 9, 1957) is an American singer, songwriter, record producer, music executive, film maker, assistant professor, and actor. A figure in what has come to be known as Christian alternative rock, Taylor enjoyed a successful solo career during the 1980s, and also served in the short-lived group Chagall Guevara. In contrast to many Christian musical artists, his songs have often taken aim at other Christians with the use of satirical, sardonic lyrics. In 1997, he founded the record label Squint Entertainment, which fueled the careers of artists such as Sixpence None the Richer, Chevelle, and Burlap to Cashmere. Despite this success, Taylor was ousted from the label by its parent, Word Entertainment, in 2001. He has produced and written for numerous musical acts, one of the most consistent being Newsboys. As a film-maker, Taylor co-wrote, directed, and produced the feature films Down Under the Big Top, The Second Chance, and Blue Like Jazz. After a decade and a half of hiatus, Taylor returned to performing music in 2010 as the front-man for Steve Taylor & The Perfect Foil, a supergroup he founded with Peter Furler, Jimmy Abegg, and John Mark Painter. Along with a university residency and continued filmmaking, Taylor would resume work on unfinished Chagall Guevara material into the 2020s.

Biography

Early life

Taylor, the eldest of three children, was born in Brawley, California. Taylor's father, Roland Taylor, was a Baptist minister. When Taylor was six years old, the family relocated to Northglenn, Colorado, a suburb of Denver. He graduated from Northglenn High School in 1976. While there, he attempted to learn the bass guitar, piano and trombone.

Upon graduation from high school, Taylor enrolled at Biola University in California. During his first year, he was first of the 100 chosen, from 20,000 applicants, to spend the summer at John Davidson's summer camp. At the camp, Taylor spent time learning from singers like Tony Orlando, Florence Henderson, and John Davidson.

Taylor returned home and enrolled at the University of Colorado at Boulder, to study "serious music". He graduated there in 1980, but described his Bachelor of Arts degree in music and theater as being worth "slightly more than the cash value of a Pizza Hut coupon."

1980s

In 1980, Taylor wrote and directed a pop musical comedy titled Nothing to Lose based on the parable of the Prodigal Son from the Bible. It had a short run at a community theater in Denver. He also wrote and starred in a short film, Joe's Distributing, a parody of avant-garde films.

Taylor wrote articles during this time that were published in The Wittenburg Door and CCM Magazine (for which he won an award from the Evangelical Press Association).

After recording a demo of original songs, Taylor began to write for the musical group the Continental Singers. The Continental Singers' founder, Cam Floria invited Taylor to join the group as assistant director on a tour to France, Italy, and Poland sponsored by Solidarity.

When he returned to the United States, he was asked to perform at the Christian Artists' 1982 Music Seminar in Denver. Billy Ray Hearn, president of Sparrow Records, was backstage and immediately signed Taylor to a recording contract.

He recorded his debut solo project I Want to Be a Clone in 1982 and released it in January 1983. He quickly gained a reputation for writing songs that satirized beliefs and practices with which he disagreed.

In 1983, Taylor recorded his first full-length album. Released in 1984, Meltdown included some of the demo material that was not on Clone along with some new material. His video single of the title track, "Meltdown (at Madame Tussauds)" was played on MTV, which was unusual for a Christian artist at the time. The video featured an appearance by actress Lisa Whelchel. The album also included "We Don't Need No Colour Code", which was critical of Bob Jones University and its anti-interracial dating policy, a policy that was not abandoned by the university until 2000.

Another track on Meltdown, "Guilty By Association", one of the original demo songs, includes a jab with an impression in the middle eight at televangelist Jimmy Swaggart. The song "On the Fritz", the title track from Taylor's next studio album, was also targeted at Swaggart. Swaggart later struck back by devoting part of a chapter of Religious Rock 'N' Roll, a Wolf in Sheep's Clothing to Taylor, whom he saw as playing evil rock music.

During a performance at 1984's Cornerstone Festival, Taylor fractured his ankle while jumping off the stage. He finished the summer's tour in an electric wheelchair.

In 1985, Taylor received his first Grammy nomination in the "Best Male Gospel Performance" category, while also being nominated for Dove Awards as "Gospel Artist of the Year" and for Meltdown as the "Best Contemporary Album of the Year". Taylor and "Some Band" performed at the Dove Awards ceremonies in Nashville in April of that year, where they were introduced by Pat Boone.

Taylor followed that release with On the Fritz, produced by Foreigner's Ian McDonald. Fritz was Taylor's first album to use all studio musicians instead of his usual backing group. Some of the musicians who played on this album were George Small, Tony DaVilio, Hugh McCracken, Carmine Rojas, Larry Fast and Allen Childs. Fritz, keeping with Taylor tradition, took aim once again at religious leaders, such as Bill Gothard ("I Manipulate"), greedy TV evangelists (again) ("You Don't Owe Me Nothing"), politicians using religion or avoiding questions of morality in order to get votes ("It's a Personal Thing"), and public schools teaching "values clarification" to children, asking them to determine who should be thrown overboard in an overcrowded lifeboat ("Lifeboat").

Taylor also recorded a duet with Sheila Walsh, "Not Gonna Fall Away", a tune written and recorded in 1981 by David Edwards. This was released as a 12" single titled "Transatlantic Remixes". Taylor and Walsh embarked on the Transatlantic Tour which included dates in the United Kingdom and the United States.

Taylor and Walsh also participated in the recording of "Do Something Now" in 1985, a collaborative effort, similar to "We Are the World", to raise money for Compassion International's famine relief programs in Africa. Other artists participating included Amy Grant, Larry Norman, Russ Taff, Randy Stonehill, Mylon LeFevre, Steve Camp, Evie, Phil Keaggy, 2nd Chapter of Acts, Sandi Patty, Bill Gaither and Rick Cua.

In between performing, recording and touring, Taylor met and married Debbie Butler of Irvine, California. They were married by Taylor's father at a private ceremony in Connecticut. Mrs. Taylor designed the album cover for a compilation on Sparrow, The Best We Could Find (Plus 3 That Never Escaped) and Myrrh's I Predict 1990, as well as some of Taylor's more colorful stage costumes.

In 1987, Taylor once again lived up to his controversial reputation with a song called "I Blew Up the Clinic Real Good". The song criticizes anyone who claims to be a anti-abortion activist who would blow up abortion clinics or kill doctors. The point of the song was lost on many and resulted in Taylor's album, I Predict 1990, being pulled from the shelves at some Christian record stores. Taylor himself would occasionally call those stores to explain the song to them. With 1990, Taylor's targets included mainstream universities ("Since I Gave Up Hope I Feel a Lot Better", featuring fiddle work from Papa John Creach of Jefferson Airplane and Hot Tuna). Other tracks included "Jim Morrison's Grave", which once again brought Taylor some MTV exposure, and the Flannery O'Connor inspired "Harder to Believe Than Not To". Some stores also pulled the album as they thought the cover looked like a tarot card.

Taylor's tour for I Predict was his most ambitious to date, bringing him to Australia, Canada, England, Finland, Hong Kong, Japan, New Zealand, Norway, Scotland, Sweden and the Philippines.

1990s

Taylor then took a break from music, until 1990 when he returned as the lead singer of Chagall Guevara.  Their first recording was "Tale o' the Twister", which appeared on the soundtrack to the 1990 film Pump Up the Volume. The band released an album, the self-titled Chagall Guevara, in 1991 on MCA Records. A follow-up album was begun, but not finished until 2022 as part of a Kickstarter campaign. The band was released from its contract, following slow sales for their debut and broke up.

Taylor returned with another solo album, Squint, and a live CD, Liver, in the mid-1990s. Squint included the track "Smug", which mocks Rush Limbaugh and Barbra Streisand as iconic masters of smugness. The album also included the song "Cash Cow", which takes a jab at yet another televangelist, Robert Tilton, as well as "Bannerman" which is a tribute to American Football fans that hold up "John 3:16" banners behind the goalposts.

A tribute to Taylor entitled I Predict a Clone: A Steve Taylor Tribute was released in 1994 that featured performances by Sixpence None the Richer, Fleming and John, Starflyer 59, Circle of Dust, and others.

In the years following those releases, Taylor focused his efforts on running Squint Entertainment and producing projects for other artists, including Sixpence None the Richer's self-titled 1997 release that featured the hit singles "Kiss Me" and a cover of The La's "There She Goes". He would be most noted for his work with Newsboys, co-producing five of the band's albums while making contributions to the band's songwriting. During this time, Taylor also directed and produced the Newsboys' 1996 movie Down Under the Big Top in which the band stars.

Taylor began working as a full-time film maker, directing music videos for Fleming and John, Rich Mullins, Sixpence None the Richer, Newsboys, Guardian, Twila Paris, Dakoda Motor Co., Out of the Grey, and two video albums for himself.

2000s

While still running Squint, Taylor had begun a film project called St. Gimp, co-written with Ben Pearson and Willie Williams. That film was abandoned in 2001 when Squint Entertainment lost its financial backing and Taylor was forced out of the company. Taylor co-wrote and directed the feature film The Second Chance starring Michael W. Smith, released February 17, 2006. He also appeared in the documentary film Why Should the Devil Have All the Good Music? (released on DVD in 2006), in interview segments and performing part of "We Don't Need No Colour Code". New music was scarce, but Taylor did contribute one song, "Shortstop", to Squint's 2000 compilation Roaring Lambs. He also recorded "Yo Ho Hero", a collaborative track for the 2008 VeggieTales movie The Pirates Who Don't Do Anything.

2010s

In 2010, Taylor began working on a film adaptation of Donald Miller's book, Blue Like Jazz. Kickstarter donations helped finish the project, and the film was released theatrically on April 13, 2012, and on DVD/Blu-ray on August 7, 2012. 

June 2011 saw the release of "Closer" (featuring Steve Taylor and Some Other Band), a collaboration with Peter Furler on his first solo album, On Fire. The group consisted of Taylor on vocals, Jimmy Abegg on guitar, John Mark Painter on bass, and Furler on drums. According to Furler, an entire album was recorded from these sessions, the material consisting of Taylor/Furler songs unused by the Newsboys. One track from the group, "A Life Preserved", was released August 7, 2012 on the Blue Like Jazz Motion Picture Soundtrack album and credited to Steve Taylor & The Perfect Foil. An "official remix" of "A Life Preserved" also surfaced at pastemagazine.com, and Taylor returned to the stage for Creation 2013 festival. A 2013 Kickstarter drive funded the band in studio and on the road.

A February 2014 Kickstarter update revealed previously completed studio work to be an album by tour co-headliner Peter Furler Band (released March 2014), with the four members of the Perfect Foil as producers. Soon after, Steve Taylor & The Perfect Foil announced via Kickstarter that their own new album Goliath was completed August 23, 2014. This marked Taylor's first studio album in twenty years. "Only a Ride", the debut single from the album, was released via streaming and mp3 download on September 16, 2014, only to Kickstarter campaign supporters. The music video for "Only a Ride" featured scenes from the film trailer for Stunt Rock, a 1980 film by director Brian Trenchard-Smith. Music videos for "Standing in Line" and the title track to Goliath followed. The album, distributed independently, through Taylor's own Splint Entertainment, was released on November 18, 2014. Plans for extensive touring were announced.

In June 2015, Taylor and the Perfect Foil entered Electrical Audio in Chicago with Daniel Smith of Danielson and engineer Steve Albini. In December 2015, Taylor announced (via Kickstarter) that the resulting EP, Wow to the Deadness, was released in January 2016, under the name Steve Taylor & The Danielson Foil.

Along with new music making, Taylor also had the honor of becoming filmmaker-in-residence at Lipscomb University's cinematic arts program. His roles would include assistant professor of film & creative media and director of the School of Theatre and Cinematic Arts. He would also begin development on another feature film, a political comedy: The Independent.

2020s

On August 1, 2020, a live crowdfunding campaign was launched  for the release of The Last Amen, the long-delayed Chagall Guevara live album. It was to be accompanied by a collection, Halcyon Days, to include rare and unreleased CG material as well as new recordings with Taylor's former band. The latter nine-track release was made available to Kickstarter backers in mid-May 2022, and was released to the public in June of that year. The band played one show together on July 2, 2022 to celebrate the release of the new album.

Discography

Studio albums
 Meltdown, 1984 album (Sparrow)
 On the Fritz, 1985 album (Sparrow)
 I Predict 1990, 1987 album (Myrrh)
 Squint, 1993 album (Warner Alliance)
 Goliath (with The Perfect Foil), 2014 album (Splint)

EPs
 I Want to Be a Clone, 1983 debut EP (Sparrow)
 Wow to the Deadness, 2016 EP (with The Danielson Foil) (Splint Entertainment/Sounds Familyre)

Live albums
 Limelight, 1986 live album (Sparrow)
 Liver, 1995 live album (Warner Alliance)
 Wow to the Liveness, 2016 live album (with The Danielson Foil) (Splint Entertainment/Sounds Familyre)
 The Last Amen, 2021 live album (with Chagall Guevara)

Compilations
 The Best We Could Find (+3 That Never Escaped), 1988 album (Sparrow)
 Christmas, 1988 album (one track by Taylor)
 Now The Truth Can Be Told, 1994 two-disc box set (WAL)
 Roaring Lambs Various Artists, 2000 compilation (one track by Taylor)
 The Pirates Who Don't Do Anything: A VeggieTales Movie Soundtrack, 2007 (one track by Taylor)
 Blue Like Jazz Motion Picture Soundtrack, 2012 (one track by Taylor; an alternate arrangement of this track can also be found on the Goliath album.)

With Chagall Guevara
 Chagall Guevara, 1991 album (MCA)
 Pump Up the Volume soundtrack, 1990, includes one song by Chagall Guevara, "Tale O' the Twister".
 "Treasure of the Broken Land" (single), 1992, included on the 1994 album Strong Hand of Love: A Tribute to Mark Heard and its 1996 re-release with more material Orphans of God.
 Halcyon Days, 2022 studio collection

Promotional singles

Music videos

Video collections
 Videoworks, 1985 video collection (Sparrow)
 Limelight, 1986 live video (Sparrow)
 I Predict 1990: The Video Album, 1987 video collection (Myrrh)
 Squint: Movies From the Soundtrack, 1993 video collection (Warner Alliance)
 Now The Truth Can Be Told, 1994 video collection (WAL)

Filmography

References

External links
 Steve Taylor - Official page for Taylor's music and film projects.
 Sock Heaven - The longest-running Steve Taylor and Chagall Guevara fan site and archive.
 
 QRSTUV - The Quantitative Roland Stephen Taylor Ubiquitous Volume (Archived)
 Steve Taylor's Digital Clone - interactive documentary about Steve
 "N The Queue" radio interview with Steve regarding "Blue Like Jazz", "Saint Gimp" and his upcoming solo album

Living people
1957 births
American performers of Christian music
Songwriters from California
People from the Denver metropolitan area
People from Nashville, Tennessee
Songwriters from Tennessee
Steve Taylor & The Perfect Foil members
Chagall Guevara members
Myrrh Records artists